3rd Training Base of the Air Force() was a formation of the People's Liberation Army Air Force of People's Republic of China. It was activated in Daxing District, Beijing from Headquarters, 106th Anti-Aircraft Artillery Division and 1st Independent Anti-Aircraft Artillery Battalion which equipped with SA-2 Guideline missile. The training base was also attached by 2nd and 3rd Independent AAA Battalions, which also equipped with SA-2s.

On March 1, 1964, the training base was reorganized into 4th Independent Anti-Aircraft Artillery Division of the Air Force. The division was then composed of 1st, 2nd, 3rd, 4th and 5th independent AAA battalions, all equipped with SA-2. The division was subordinated to Air Force of Beijing Military Region.

From April 7, 1965, to December 1967 the division was transferred to headquarters of PLAAF's control before it was returned to Air Force of Beijing MR.

On March 1, 1976, the division was renamed as  4th Anti-Aircraft Missile Division of the Air Force. The division was then composed of 22nd, 23rd and 24th anti-aircraft missile regiments.

On September 10, 1985, the division was reduced to  14th Anti-Aircraft Missile Brigade of the Air Force.

In 1994, the division was re-expanded to 4th Anti-Aircraft Missile Division of the Air Force.

Air defense victories

Current structure (2010)
4th Anti-Aircraft Missile Division - Huairou District, Beijing
2nd Anti-Aircraft Missile Regiment - Chengde, Hebei
35th AA Missile Battalion (HQ-2) - ?
69th AA Missile Battalion (HQ-2) - 
82nd AA Missile Battalion (HQ-2) - 
112th AA Missile Battalion (HQ-2) - 
11th Anti-Aircraft Missile Regiment - Miyun District, Beijing
41st AA Missile Battalion (S-300) - 
50th AA Missile Battalion (S-300) - ?
85th AA Missile Battalion (S-300) - 
12th Anti-Aircraft Missile Regiment - Huairou District, Beijing
2nd AA Missile Battalion (HQ-9) - 
80th AA Missile Battalion (HQ-9) - ?
83rd AA Missile Battalion (HQ-9) - 
84th AA Missile Battalion (HQ-9) - 

Units marked with "?" do not appear on Satellite map as of 2018.

References
中国空军五四三部队之谜, http://cpc.people.com.cn/GB/68742/77130/77131/8738589.html

Divisions of the People's Liberation Army
Air defence units and formations
Military units and formations established in 1959